Kendriya Vidyalaya, NTPC Kayamkulam is located in the town of Cheppad, Haripad. Affiliated to CBSE, this school started functioning on 28 July 1999. Under the funding of NTPC, Kendriya Vidyalaya caters mainly to the needs of the project employees. This KV, along with all the other KV's strives to provide quality education to children across India. It is a part of the Kendriya Vidyalaya Sangathan under the Ministry of Human Resource Development, Govt of India

Infrastructure

There are 13 classrooms, five science labs, a fully automated library, an art room, a computer lab, an Audio-Visual room, a children playground, a cricket pitch, a volleyball court, a football ground and an athletics field. The Vidyalaya has spacious buildings with all infrastructural facilities like well ventilated class rooms, full-fledged laboratories in physics, chemistry, biology for +2 classes, mathematics lab, language lab, computer lab with more than 25 computers, A.V. room with LCD projector, O.H. projectors, activity room, broadband internet facility with LAN, vast play ground with basketball & shuttle badminton courts etc.

Library

The Vidyalaya library has over 6672 titles and subscribe to about 40 periodicals. The Kendriya Vidyalaya Sangathan adopted the new library policy as per thand 138 in its Education Code 2008. The library is automated by using PALIbS library management software. All the books are classified and bar-coded. Apart from the main library class room, a section is being maintained exclusively for primary children. Children write book reviews for every book they read. Library committee is formed to make the library services more effective. Guidance and counselling section is functioning in the library by providing necessary library materials to the Vidyalaya community. The library maintains a website.

Education

The school follows 10+2 pattern of CBSE. It has one classroom for each of the twelve classes. It provides for a general education of 10 years leading to the All India Secondary School Examination of the Central Board of Secondary Education (CBSE).

References 

Kendriya Vidyalayas in Kerala
Schools in Alappuzha district